Kenneth Parr (born 3 October 1988) is a male British sport shooter who has medalled at three Commonwealth Games. In 2016 he won a silver medal at the ISSF World Cup in Baku.

Sport shooting career
Parr has competed for England in three consecutive Commonwealth Games. He won two silver medals at the 2010 Commonwealth Games in Delhi, in the 50 metre rifle three positions pairs and Men's 10 metre air rifle pairs with James Huckle. Four years later he won a bronze medal in the 50 metre rifle prone event at the 2014 Commonwealth Games.

In 2016 he won a silver medal in the Men's 50m Prone Rifle event at the Baku World Cup. This qualified him for the World Cup Final in Bologna where he finished seventh.

At the 2018 Commonwealth Games he won a second bronze medal in Men's 50m Prone Rifle.

In 2019 with teammate Seonaid McIntosh, Kenneth won Bronze in the 50m rifle mixed team event at the European Championships in Bologna.

Personal life
He is the son of the two times Commonwealth Games medallist Ken Parr (sport shooter).

References

External links

1988 births
Living people
English male sport shooters
Commonwealth Games silver medallists for England
Commonwealth Games bronze medallists for England
Shooters at the 2010 Commonwealth Games
Shooters at the 2014 Commonwealth Games
Shooters at the 2018 Commonwealth Games
Commonwealth Games medallists in shooting
Medallists at the 2010 Commonwealth Games
Medallists at the 2014 Commonwealth Games
Medallists at the 2018 Commonwealth Games